Dangriga Airport , also called Pelican Beach Airstrip, is a public use airport located  north of Dangriga, a coastal town in the Stann Creek District of Belize.

Airlines and destinations

See also

Transport in Belize
List of airports in Belize

References

External links 
OurAirports - Dangriga Airport
Aerodromes in Belize - pdf

Airports in Belize
Stann Creek District
Dangriga